Ernest Gedrevich Mackevičius (25 November 1968, Vilnius) is a Russian journalist and TV host. Presenter of the programs Good Morning, Russia (2002–2005) and Vesti (since 2006).

Biography
Born on 25 November 1968 in Vilnius. Ernest's father is theatre director Giedrius Mackevičius. Mother Marina Mackevičienė is a journalist with the newspaper Vechernyaya Moskva. He graduated from the Moscow school No. 579, then he passed military service in the border troops. In 1994 he graduated from the newspaper department of the MSU Faculty of Journalism. He studied on the same course with his future colleagues on the  NTV Vladimir Lensky, Sergey Gaponov, Vyacheslav Grunsky, Sergey Dedukh, Andrey Cherkasov, Alexander Khabarov and Vladimir Chernyshev. He also studied for some time on the same course with Andrey Malakhov and Dmitry Lesnevsky, who, due to various circumstances, graduated from the university later.

He has worked in television since 1991, starting as the TV company VIDgital correspondent.

Ernest was awarded the Medal of the Order for Services to the Fatherland I class (2008) and the Order of Friendship (2014).

He is married to Alina Akhmetova, there is a daughter Dahlia (born 2004).

References

External links 
 Биография на сайте телеканала «Россия-1»
 

1968 births
Living people
Journalists from Vilnius
Russian television personalities
20th-century Russian journalists
21st-century Russian journalists
Recipients of the Medal of the Order "For Merit to the Fatherland" I class
Moscow State University alumni
Russian people of Lithuanian descent